Mahmoud Ezzat (born 1961) is a leader of the Muslim Brotherhood in Egypt.

Mahmoud Ezzat (محمود عزت) may also refer to:
 Mahmoud Ezzat (boxer) (1913–1974), Egyptian boxer
 Mahmoud Ezzat (footballer) (born 1992), Egyptian footballer